Naso or Nasso ( — Hebrew for "take a census" or "lift up," the sixth word, and the first distinctive word, in the parashah) is the 35th weekly Torah portion (parashah) in the annual Jewish cycle of Torah reading and the second in the Book of Numbers. It constitutes . The parashah addresses priestly duties, camp purification, restitution for wrongs committed, the wife accused of unfaithfulness (sotah), the nazirite, the Priestly Blessing, and consecration of the Tabernacle. Naso has the largest number of letters, words, and verses of any of the 54 weekly Torah portions. The parashah is made up of 8,632 Hebrew letters, 2,264 Hebrew words, 176 verses, and 311 lines in a Torah Scroll (Sefer Torah).

Jews generally read it in late May or June, typically (though not always) on the first Shabbat after Shavuot.

Readings

First reading — Numbers 4:21–37
In the first reading (aliyah), God told Moses to take a census of the Gershonites between 30 and 50 years old, who were subject to service for the Tabernacle. The Gershonites had the duty, under the direction of Aaron's son Ithamar, to carry the cloths of the Tabernacle, the Tent of Meeting with its covering, the covering of tachash skin on top of it, the screen for the entrance of the Tent of Meeting, the hangings of the enclosure, the screen at the entrance of the gate of the enclosure surrounding the Tabernacle, the cords thereof, the altar, and all their service equipment and accessories. Moses was also to take a census of the Merarites between 30 and 50 years old. The Merarites had responsibility, under the direction of Ithamar, for the planks, the bars, the posts, and the sockets of the Tabernacle, and the posts around the enclosure and their sockets, pegs, and cords. Moses, Aaron, and the chieftains recorded 2,750 Kohathites age 30 to 50.

Second reading — Numbers 4:38–49
In the second reading (aliyah), Moses, Aaron, and the chieftains recorded the Levites age 30 to 50 as follows:
Kohathites: 2,750,
Gershonites: 2,630, and
Merarites: 3,200,
making a total of 8,580 undertaking the work of service and the work of bearing burdens.

Third reading — Numbers 5:1–10
In the third reading (aliyah), God directed the Israelites to remove from camp anyone with an eruption or a discharge and anyone defiled by a corpse, so that they would not defile the camp. God told Moses to direct the Israelites that when one wronged a fellow Israelite, thus breaking faith with God, and realized his guilt, he was to confess the wrong and make restitution to the one wronged in the principal amount plus one-fifth. If the one wronged had died, it is implied that restitution was to be made to a kinsman, and if there is no kinsman to whom restitution could be made, the amount repaid was to go to the priest, along (in any case) with a ram of expiation.

Similarly, any gift among the sacred donations that the Israelites offered was to be the priest's to keep.

Fourth reading — Numbers 5:11–6:27
In the fourth reading (aliyah), God told Moses to instruct the Israelites about the test where a husband, in a fit of jealousy, accused his wife of being unfaithful — the ritual of the sotah. The man was to bring his wife to the priest, along with barley flour as a meal offering of jealousy. The priest was to dissolve some earth from the floor of the Tabernacle into some sacral water in an earthen vessel. The priest was to bare the woman's head, place the meal offering on her hands, and adjure the woman: if innocent, to be immune to harm from the water of bitterness, but if guilty, to be cursed to have her thigh sag and belly distend. And the woman was to say, "Amen, amen!" The priest was to write these curses down, rub the writing off into the water of bitterness, and make the woman drink the water. The priest was to elevate the meal offering, present it on the altar, and burn a token part of it on the altar. If she had broken faith with her husband, the water would cause her belly to distend and her thigh to sag, and the woman was to become a curse among her people, but if the woman was innocent, she would remain unharmed and be able to bear children.

In the continuation of the fourth reading, God told Moses to instruct the Israelites about the vows of a nazirite (nazir), should one wish to set himself or herself apart for God. The nazirite was to abstain from wine, intoxicants, vinegar, grapes, raisins, or anything obtained from the grapevine. No razor was to touch the nazirite's head until the completion of the nazirite term. And the nazirite was not to go near a dead person, even a father, mother, brother, or sister. If a person died suddenly near a nazirite, the nazirite was to shave his or her head on the seventh day. On the eighth day, the nazirite was to bring two turtledoves or two pigeons to the priest, who was to offer one as a sin offering and the other as a burnt offering. That same day, the nazirite was to reconsecrate his or her head, rededicate the nazirite term, and bring a lamb in its first year as a penalty offering. On the day that a nazirite completed his or her term, the nazirite was to be brought to the entrance of the Tent of Meeting and present a male lamb in its first year for a burnt offering, a ewe lamb in its first year for a sin offering, a ram for an offering of well-being, a basket of unleavened cakes, unleavened wafers spread with oil, and meal offerings. The priest was to present the offerings, and the nazirite was to shave his or her consecrated hair and put the hair on the fire under the sacrifice of well-being.

In the conclusion of the fourth reading, God told Moses to instruct Aaron and his sons that they should bless the Israelites with this blessing: "The Lord bless you and protect you! The Lord deal kindly and graciously with you! The Lord bestow His favor upon you and grant you peace!"

Fifth reading — Numbers 7:1–41
In the fifth reading (aliyah), Moses finished setting up the Tabernacle, and anointed and consecrated it, its furnishings, the altar, and its utensils. The chieftains of the tribes then brought their offerings — 6 carts and 12 oxen — and God told Moses to accept them for use by the Levites in the service of the Tent of Meeting. He allocated two carts and four oxen to the Gershonites and the remaining four carts and eight oxen to the Merarites. None were allocated to the Kohathites, 'because the sacred objects they took care of had to be carried on their shoulders'.

The chieftains then each on successive days brought the same dedication offerings for the altar: a silver bowl and silver basin filled with flour mixed with oil, a gold ladle filled with incense, a bull, 2 oxen, 5 rams, 5 goats, and 5 lambs.

Sixth reading — Numbers 7:42–71
In the sixth reading (aliyah), the chieftains continued to bring dedication offerings for the altar.

Seventh reading — Numbers 7:72–89
In the seventh reading (aliyah), the chieftains from the remaining tribes bought their dedication offerings for the altar. When Moses went into the Tent of Meeting to speak with God, Moses would hear the Voice addressing him from above the cover that was on top of the Ark between the two cherubim, and thus God spoke to him.

Readings according to the triennial cycle
Jews who read the Torah according to the triennial cycle of Torah reading read the parashah according to the following schedule:

In inner-Biblical interpretation
The parashah has parallels or is discussed in these Biblical sources:

Numbers chapter 4

 refers to duties of the Levites.  reports that Levites taught the law.  reports that they served as judges. And  reports that they blessed God's name.  reports that of 38,000 Levite men age 30 and up, 24,000 were in charge of the work of the Temple in Jerusalem, 6,000 were officers and magistrates, 4,000 were gatekeepers, and 4,000 praised God with instruments and song.  reports that King David installed Levites as singers with musical instruments, harps, lyres, and cymbals, and  reports that David appointed Levites to minister before the Ark, to invoke, to praise, and to extol God. And  reports at the inauguration of Solomon's Temple, Levites sang dressed in fine linen, holding cymbals, harps, and lyres, to the east of the altar, and with them 120 priests blew trumpets.  reports that Levites of the sons of Kohath and of the sons of Korah extolled God in song. Eleven Psalms identify themselves as of the Korahites.

Numbers chapter 5

Corpse contamination
In , God instructed Moses to command the Israelites to put out of the camp every person defiled by contact with the dead, so that they would not defile their camps, in the midst of which God dwelt. This is one of a series of passages setting out the teaching that contact with the dead is antithetical to purity.

In , God instructed Moses to direct the priests not to allow themselves to become defiled by contact with the dead, except for a mother, father, son, daughter, brother, or unmarried sister. And the priests were not to engage in mourning rituals of making baldness upon their heads, shaving off the corners of their beards, or cutting their flesh.

 sets out a procedure for a red heifer mixture for decontamination from corpse contamination.

In its profession associated with tithing,  instructed Israelites to aver that they had not eaten from the tithe in mourning, nor put away any of it while unclean, nor given any of it to the dead.

In , the prophet Ezekiel cites the burial of kings within the Temple as one of the practices that defiled the Temple and cause God to abandon it.

Perhaps similarly,  associates uncleanness with childbirth and  associates it with skin disease.  associates it with various sexuality-related events.

Repentance for false swearing
And  requires the offender to bring to the priest an unblemished ram for a guilt-offering, and the priest shall make atonement for the offender before God, and the offender shall be forgiven.

 directs that when people commit any sin against God, then they shall confess and make restitution in full to the victim and add a fifth part. And  provides that if the victim has no heir to whom restitution may be made, the offender must make restitution to the priest, in addition to the ram of atonement.

The Sotah

Numbers chapter 6

The Nazirite
 sets forth the laws of the nazirite.  tells how an angel directed Manoah and his wife that their then-unborn son Samson would be a nazirite. And 1 Samuel  tells how Hannah pledged her then-unborn son Samuel to be a nazirite.

The prophet Amos compared nazirites to prophets, teaching that God raised up both. And Amos chastised Israel for inducing nazirites to drink wine.

Numbers chapter 7
At the same time, the ordination events of  took place. And  then reports that the second Passover for those unable to participate in the first Passover would commence "in the second month, on the fourteenth day of the month."

In classical rabbinic interpretation
The parashah is discussed in these rabbinic sources from the era of the Mishnah and the Talmud:

Numbers chapter 4
The Midrash taught that Scripture gives Kohath precedence over Gershon because the Kohathites bore the Ark that carried the Torah. Similarly, another Midrash taught that God ordered the Kohathites counted first because Kohath was most holy, for Aaron the priest — who was most holy — descended from Kohath, while Gershon was only holy. And  says "they also" with regard to the Gershonites so that one should not suppose that the Gershonites were numbered second because they were inferior to the Kohathites; rather  says "they also" to indicate that the Gershonites were also like the Kohathites in every respect, and the Kohathites were placed first in this connection as a mark of respect to the Torah. In other places; however, Scripture places Gershon before Kohath.

A Midrash noted that in  "the Lord spoke to Moses and Aaron" to direct them to count the Kohathites and in  "the Lord spoke to Moses" to direct him to count the Gershonites, but  does not report that "the Lord spoke" to direct them to count the Merarites. The Midrash deduced that  employed the words "the Lord spoke" so as to give honor to Gershon as the firstborn, and to give him the same status as Kohath. The Midrash then noted that  reported that God spoke "to Aaron" with regard to the Kohathites but  did not report communication to Aaron with regard to the Gershonites. The Midrash taught that God excluded Aaron from all Divine communications to Moses and that passages that mention Aaron do not report that God spoke to Aaron, but include Aaron's name in sections that concern Aaron to indicate that God spoke to Moses so that he might repeat what he heard to Aaron. Thus  mentions Aaron regarding the Kohathites because Aaron and his sons assigned the Kohathites their duties, since (as  relates) the Kohathites were not permitted to touch the ark or any of the vessels until Aaron and his sons had covered them. In the case of the Gershonites, however, the Midrash finds no evidence that Aaron personally interfered with them, as Ithamar supervised their tasks, and thus  does not mention Aaron in connection with the Gershonites.

The Midrash deduced that God honored the Kohathites on account of the honor of the Ark and the Gershonites because Gershon was a firstborn. But since the Merarites neither cared for the Ark nor descended from a firstborn, God did not use the expression "lift up the head."

The Midrash deduced that this is so because the importance of the Gershonites comes from their fathers' house, as Gershon was the firstborn.

The Tosefta noted that , 23, 30, 35, 39, 43, and 47 say that Levites "30 years old and upward" did service in the tent of meeting, while  says, "from 25 years old and upward they shall go in to perform the service in the work of the tent of meeting." The Tosefta deduced that the difference teaches that all those five years, from the age of 25 to the age of 30, Levites studied, serving apprenticeships, and from that time onward they were allowed to draw near to do service. The Tosefta concluded that a Levite could not enter the Temple courtyard to do service unless he had served an apprenticeship of five years. And the Tosefta inferred from this that students who see no sign of success in their studies within a period of five years will never see any.

The Gemara thus concluded that just as the lower covering could be called a “tent,” so is the upper covering could be considered a “tent” for purposes of impurity caused by a corpse.

Rabbi Jose employed  to calculate the height of the walls of the courtyard in relation to the height of the outer altar. Rabbi Judah maintained that the outer altar was wider than Rabbi Jose thought it was, whereas Rabbi Jose maintained that the outer altar was taller than Rabbi Judah thought it was. But Rabbi Judah noted that  uses the word "square" (ravua), just as  uses the word "square" (ravua). The Gemara explained that we know that this is how to understand  because  says, "And the hearth shall be 12 cubits long by 12 cubits broad, square," and  continues, "to the four sides thereof," teaching that the measurement was taken from the middle (interpreting "to" as intimating that from a particular point, there were 12 cubits in all directions, hence from the center). Rabbi Jose, however, reasoned that a common use of the word "square" applied to the height of the altar. But Rabbi Jose noted that  uses the word "square" (ravua), just as  uses the word "square" (ravua, referring to the inner altar). Rabbi Judah questioned Rabbi Jose's conclusion, for if priests stood on the altar to perform the service 10 cubits above the ground, the people would see them from outside the courtyard. Rabbi Jose replied to Rabbi Judah that  states, "And the hangings of the court, and the screen for the door of the gate of the court, which is by the Tabernacle and by the altar round about," teaching that just as the Tabernacle was 10 cubits high, so was the altar 10 cubits high; and  says, "The hangings for the one side were fifteen cubits" (teaching that the walls of the courtyard were 15 cubits high). Rabbi Judah, however, granted that the priest could be seen outside the Tabernacle, but argued that the sacrifice in his hands could not be seen.

A Midrash taught that the Levites camped on the four sides of the Tabernacle in accordance with their duties. The Midrash explained that from the west came snow, hail, cold, and heat, and thus God placed the Gershonites on the west, as  indicates that their service was "the tent, the covering thereof, and the screen for the door of the tent of meeting," which could shield against snow, hail, cold, and heat. The Midrash explained that from the north came darkness, and thus the Merarites camped there, as  indicates that their service was the carrying of wood ("the boards of the tabernacle, and the bars thereof, and the pillars thereof, and the sockets thereof") which  teaches counteract idolatrous influences when it says, "The chastisement of vanities is wood." And the Midrash explained that from the east comes light, and thus Moses, Aaron, and his sons camped there, because they were scholars and men of pious deeds, bringing atonement by their prayer and sacrifices.

A Midrash inferred from the words "from 30 years old . . . every one that entered upon the service" in  that a man attains his full strength at age 30.

Reading , "to do the work of service," the Gemara taught that Levites became unfit for service with the passage of years, as they were fit for service only between the ages of 30 and 50. The Gemara taught that Priests, in contrast remained fit with the passage of years, from the moment that they reached majority for the rest of their lives. But the Gemara clarified that the mandatory retirement requirement for Levites at the age of 50 applied only with regard to the Tent of Meeting of the Tabernacle in the wilderness, whereas with regard to Shiloh and in the Temple in Jerusalem, Levites were disqualified only due to a change in voice that rendered them unable to recite the songs in the Temple with their brethren.

Belvati reasoned that the work that requires service is the song.

Numbers chapter 5
Those who were ritually impure needed to be excluded from the camp before the construction and dedication of the Tabernacle took place otherwise the camp and Tabernacle would have been defiled from the outset. The Gemara reported that Rabbi Joḥanan interpreted , "Take this book of the law," to refer to the time after the Torah had been joined together from its several parts. And the Gemara suggested that Resh Lakish interpreted , "in a roll of the book written of me," to indicate that the whole Torah is called a "roll," as  says, "And he said to me, 'What do you see?' And I answered, 'I see a flying roll.'" Or perhaps, the Gemara suggested, it is called "roll" for the reason given by Rabbi Levi, who said that God gave eight sections of the Torah, which Moses then wrote on separate rolls, on the day on which the Tabernacle was set up.

Reading , "When a man or woman shall commit any sin," Rav Judah said on behalf of Rav, and it was also taught at the school of Rabbi Ishmael, that Scripture thus made women and men equal regarding all the penalties of the Law. The Gemara cited this conclusion to support the ruling of the Mishnah that women are subject to the law of torts.

The Mishnah taught that if one stole from another something worth a perutah (the minimum amount of significant value) and the thief nonetheless swore that the thief did not do so, the thief was obliged to take restitution to the victim even if the thief needed to go as far as Media (in what is now Iran). The thief could not give restitution to the victim's son or agent, but the thief could give it to an agent of the court. If the victim died, the thief had to restore it to the victim's heirs.

(The Mishnah did not consider the payment of the fifth as an essential condition of atonement.) If, however, the thief paid the victim the fifth but not the principal; or the victim excused the thief the fifth but not the principal; or even where the victim excused the thief for both, except for something more than the value of a perutah remaining of the principal, then the thief would have to convey it personally to the victim (even as far as Media).

If the depositor asked where the thing deposited was, and an unpaid custodian replied that it was lost, and the depositor then imposed an oath on the custodian, and the custodian swore that the deposit was lost, if witnesses then testified that the custodian consumed the thing deposited, then the custodian had to repay the principal.

The Mishnah taught that if one stole from one's father and, when charged by the father, denied it on oath, and the father then died before the child confessed to the father's heirs, then the child would have to repay the principal and a fifth to the father's other children or to the father's brothers (the child's uncles) if the child had no siblings. But if the child was unwilling to forfeit the child's share in the payment that child had to make, or if the child had no resources, then the child was to borrow the amount from others and perform the duty of restoration to the heirs, and the creditors could subsequently come and demand to be paid the portion that would by law have belonged to the child as heir.

Reading , Rabbi Ishmael asked what Jew would not have a kinsman to whom to make restitution, as all Jews descend from Jacob and thus are all kin. Rabbi Ishmael thus interpreted  to apply to one who robs a convert and makes an oath to the convert, but before the thief can make restitution, the convert dies without any wife or children (viewing a convert as a newborn, without relationship to those born prior to the convert's conversion).

The Midrash compared God's great love of converts to a king who had a flock of goats, and once a stag came in with the flock. When the king was told that the stag had joined the flock, the king felt an affection for the stag and gave orders that the stag have good pasture and drink and that no one beat him. When the king's servants asked him why he protected the stag, the king explained that the flock have no choice, but the stag did. The king accounted it as a merit to the stag that had left behind the whole of the broad, vast wilderness, the abode of all the beasts, and had come to stay in the courtyard. In like manner, God provided converts with special protection, for God exhorted Israel not to harm them, as  says, “Love therefore the convert,” and  says, “And a convert shall you not oppress.” In the same manner also as the  has imposed upon one who robs another the obligation of a money payment and of a sacrifice of a ram of atonement, so the Torah imposed upon one who robs a convert the obligation of paying the convert his money and of bringing a sacrifice of a ram of atonement.

The Mishnah interpreted the requirements of  regarding restitution where the victim died without kin to apply as well to where a convert victim died. The wrongdoer would have to pay the priests the principal plus 20 percent and bring a trespass offering to the altar. If the wrongdoer died bringing the money and the offering to Jerusalem, the money was to go to the wrongdoer's heirs, and the offering was to be kept on the pasture until it became blemished, when it was to be sold and the proceeds were to go to the fund for freewill offerings. But if the wrongdoer had already given the money to the priest and then died, the heirs could not retrieve the funds, for  provides that "whatever any man gives to the priest shall be his."

The Sotah

Hezekiah the son of Rabbi Parnak said in the name of Rabbi Joḥanan that the laws of the woman accused of being unfaithful in  follow immediately on laws dealing with the heave offering (terumah) and tithes to teach that if one has a heave offering or a tithe and does not give it to the priest, in the end he will require the priest's services to deal with his wife. For  says, "Every man's hallowed things shall be his," and immediately afterwards  says, "If any man's wife go aside," and thereafter  says, "the man shall bring his wife to the priest." Even more, in the end, such a person would need the tithe for the poor, as  says, "Every man's hallowed things shall be his" (in the form of a tithe for the poor). In contrast, Rav Nachman bar Yitzchak taught that if he does give, he will eventually become rich. For  says, "Whatever a man gives the priest, he shall have," and that means that he shall have much wealth.

Rabbi Eliezer said that he warned her on the testimony of two witnesses, and made her drink the bitter water on the testimony of one witness or his own testimony. Rabbi Joshua said that he warned her on the testimony of two witnesses and made her drink on the testimony of two witnesses.

The Mishnah taught that it was not sufficient for the husband simply to say to his wife (in the presence of two witnesses) not to converse with a man. And if she nonetheless conversed with him, she was still permitted to her husband and (if a daughter of a Kohen) still permitted to eat from sacrifices. If, however, she entered a private place with the man and stayed with him long enough to have committed misconduct, she was forbidden to her husband and forbidden to eat from sacrifices, and if her husband died, she was required to perform the ceremony of halizah and could not contract a levirate marriage.

And Rabbi Akiva taught that in the event that she was guilty, just as she was prohibited to her husband (who would have to divorce her), so was she prohibited to the paramour (and could not marry him), for  says, "defiled ... And is defiled." Rabbi Joshua taught that Zechariah ben HaKazav used to expound the matter that way. The Gemara explained that just as the guilty woman would be punished in her belly and thigh, so too would the paramour.

Reading the report of  that Moses "took the calf ... ground it to powder, and sprinkled it on the water, and made the children of Israel drink it," the Sages interpreted that Moses meant to test the Israelites much as the procedure of  tested a wife accused of adultery (sotah).

A Midrash taught that there is nothing greater before God than the "amen" that Israel answers. Rabbi Judah ben Sima taught that the word "amen" contains three kinds of solemn declarations: oath, consent, and confirmation.  demonstrates oath when it says, "Then the priest shall cause the woman to swear ... and the woman shall say: 'Amen, Amen.'"  demonstrates consent when it says "And all the people shall say: 'Amen.'" And 1 Kings  demonstrates confirmation when it says, "And Benaiah the son of Jehoiada answered the king, and said: 'Amen; so say the Lord.'"

A Baraita read , “And the man shall be cleared of transgression, and that woman shall bear her transgression,” to teach that when the husband was clear of transgression, the waters evaluated his wife's faithfulness, but if the husband was not clear of transgression, the waters did not evaluate his wife's faithfulness.

Numbers chapter 6

The Nazirite

Similarly, a Midrash taught that when they made the suspected wife drink, they told her that much might have been due to wine. And all the Israelites who had seen it would come home and bemoan the person who had drunk wine, got intoxicated, committed sin, and died. And so they would swear never to taste wine, so that they might not meet the same fate. And the Midrash provided another explanation: Just as the nazirite was separated from wine, so God separated the faithless wife from other women. Similarly, another Midrash taught that wine leads to whoredom. And thus God wrote the section about the nazirite after the section about the suspected wife to indicate that one should not copy the deeds of the adulterer and adulteress who drank wine and disgraced themselves, but that one who is afraid of sin should separate from wine.

The Sifre taught that the rule of  thus applied only to those who knew the meaning of making such a special vow. And on that basis the rule of Mishnah Niddah 5:6 was given that the vows of a boy of the age of 12 years and one day must be examined (to ascertain whether the boy understood their significance).

The Mishnah taught that all substitutes for a nazirite vow functioned just like a nazirite vow. A person who said, "I shall be one," became a nazirite. A person who said, "I shall be comely," "a nazirite," "a nazik," "a naziah," or "a paziah," became a nazirite. A person who said, "I intend to be like this," or "I intend to curl my hair," or "I mean to tend my hair," or "I undertake to develop tresses," became a nazirite. Rabbi Meir said that a person who said, "I take upon myself an obligation involving birds," became a nazirite," but the sages said that the person did not become a nazirite.

A person who said, "I declare myself a nazirite to abstain from pressed grapes," or "from grape stones," or "from cutting my hair," or "from contracting ritual defilement," became a nazirite subject to all the regulations of naziriteship.

A person who said, "I vow to be like Samson," "the son of Manoah," "the husband of Delilah," or "the one who plucked up the gates of Gaza," or "the one whose eyes the Philistines put out," became a nazirite like Samson (who was a nazirite for life). The difference between nazirites like Samson and life-nazirites was that life-nazirites could thin their hair with a razor and then offer three animal sacrifices, while should they be ritually defiled, they had to offer the sacrifice prescribed for defilement. Nazirites like Samson were not permitted to thin their hair, and if ritually defiled, they did not offer the sacrifice prescribed for defilement.

A nazirite vow of unspecified duration remained in force 30 days.

The Sifre asked why  set forth the effectiveness of nazirite vows, when the general rule of  would suffice to teach that all vows — including nazirite vows — are binding. The Sifre explained that  warned that a person making a nazirite vow would be bound to at least a 30-day nazirite period.

A person who said, "I intend to be a nazirite for one long period," or "I intend to be a nazirite for one short period," became a nazirite for 30 days, even if the person added, "for as long as it takes to go from here to the end of the earth." A person who said, "I intend to be a nazirite, plus one day," or "I intend to be a nazirite, plus an hour," or "I intend to be a nazirite, once and a half," became a nazirite for two 30-day periods. A person who said, "I intend to be a nazirite for 30 days plus an hour," became a nazirite for 31 days, as there was no naziriteship for a period of hours.

People who said, "I intend to be a nazirite as the hairs of my head," or "the dust of the earth," or "the sands of the sea," became life-nazirites, cutting their hair every 30 days. Rabbi said that such nazirites did not cut their hair every 30 days. Rabbi said that the nazirites who cut their hair every 30 days were the ones who said, "I undertake naziriteships as the hair on my head," or "the dust of the earth," or "the sands of the sea."

They interrogated people who said, "I intend to be a nazirite a house full," or "a basket full," to determine their intent. A person who said, "I vowed one long period of naziriteship," became a nazirite for 30 days. But a person who said, "I vowed without attaching any precise meaning to the statement," became a nazirite for life, as the Rabbis regarded the basket as though it were full of mustard seed.

If a person said, "I intend to be a nazirite, as from here to such and such a place," they estimated the number of days that it took to get to the place mentioned. If the journey would take fewer than 30 days, then the nazirite becomes a nazirite for 30 days; otherwise the nazirite became a nazirite for that number of days.

A person who said, "I intend to be a nazirite, as the number of days in a solar year," would be a nazirite for 365 terms. Rabbi Judah said that such a case once occurred, and when the nazirite completed the 365 terms, the nazirite died.

Rabbi Simeon the Just was so skeptical of the reasons for which nazirites might have interrupted their status that he found only one that he really trusted. He said that only once in his life had he eaten of the trespass-offering brought by a defiled tear in connection with an interrupted nazirite vow. On that occasion a nazirite came from the South country, and Simeon the Just saw that he had beautiful eyes, was of handsome appearance, and with thick locks of hair symmetrically arranged. Simeon the Just asked him what reason the nazirite had seen to destroy this beautiful hair by shaving it for the nazirite vow. The nazirite replied that he was a shepherd for his father and once he went to draw water from a well and gazed upon his reflection in the water, and his evil desires rushed upon him and sought to drive him from the world through sin. But the shepherd swore that day that he would shave his beautiful hair off for the sake of Heaven. Simeon the Just immediately arose and kissed the nazirite's head, praying that there would be many nazirites such as him in Israel. And Simeon the Just said that it was of this nazirite that  says, "When either a man or a woman shall separate themselves to vow a vow of a nazirite, to separate themselves unto the Lord ..." Rabbi Mani inquired why Simeon the Just did not eat of the guilt-offering of a nazirite. If it was because the nazirite was a sinner because he tormented himself, depriving himself of wine, that would be inconsistent with ever eating of the sin-offering (for example) for tasting forbidden fat or of the sin-offering for tasting blood. Simeon the Just thought that people made the nazirite vow in a fit of temper, and since they vowed in a fit of temper they would ultimately come to regret it. And once they regretted it, their sacrifices become like those of people who slaughtered unconsecrated animals in the Temple court (which would be disrespectful and forbidden). This nazirite, however, vowed after due mental deliberation and his mouth and heart were in agreement.

The Mishnah taught that  forbade a nazirite three things: ritual defilement, cutting of hair, and products of the vine. The Mishnah taught that all products of the vine could be measured together, and that there was no penalty for violation of the nazirite's vow unless the nazirite ate an olive's bulk of grapes or drank a quarter of a log of wine. Rabbi Akiva said that there was a penalty even if the nazirite soaked bread in wine and enough was absorbed to make up an olive's bulk.

The Mishnah taught that there was a separate penalty for wine, for grapes, for grape seeds, and for grape skins. But Rabbi Eleazar ben Azariah said that there was no penalty for grape seeds or grape skins unless the nazirite ate at least two grape seeds and one grape skin.

In the Talmud, Rabbi Joshua discouraged asceticism and abstaining from wine. The Rabbis taught in a Baraita that when the Romans destroyed the Second Temple, large numbers of Judeans became ascetics, binding themselves neither to eat meat nor to drink wine. Rabbi Joshua asked the ascetics why they did not eat meat or drink wine. The ascetics asked how they could eat meat when priests used to offer meat on the altar that the Romans had destroyed. And they asked how they could drink wine when priests used to pour wine as a libation on the altar (as part of the Temple service), but did so no more. Rabbi Joshua told them that according to their logic, they should not eat bread either, as the meal offerings had ceased. The ascetics agreed, saying that they could live on fruit. Rabbi Joshua told them that they should not eat fruit either, for there was no longer an offering of first fruits. The ascetics replied that they could manage with other fruits (of types that the Israelites had not brought as first fruits). But Rabbi Joshua told them that they should not drink water either, for there was no longer a ceremony of the pouring of water (on Sukkot, as described in Mishnah Sukkah 4:1, 9–10). To this the ascetics had no answer. So Rabbi Joshua taught them that not to mourn at all was impossible, because the Temple had been destroyed. But to mourn too much was also impossible, because we may not impose on the community a hardship that the majority cannot endure.

If nazirites cut their hair or had their hair cut by bandits, 30 days of their nazirite term were rendered void. Nazirites who cut their own hair incurred a penalty, no matter whether they used scissors or a razor, or no matter how little they trimmed their hair. Nazirites were allowed to clean their hair or part it with their fingers, but they were not allowed to comb it. Rabbi Ishmael said that they were not allowed to clean their hair with earth, because it causes the hair to fall out.

A nazirite who drank wine all day long incurred only a single penalty. If the nazirite was repeatedly warned not to drink and then drank anyway, the nazirite incurred a penalty for each warning. Similarly, nazirites who cut their hair all day long incurred only one penalty, but if they were repeatedly warned not to cut and then cut anyway, they incurred a penalty for each warning. And similarly, nazirites who defile themselves by contact with the dead all day long incurred only one penalty, but if they were repeatedly warned not to defile themselves and then defiled themselves anyway, they incurred a penalty for each warning.

The Mishnah taught that defilement and cutting of hair had a stringency that products of the vine did not, as defilement and cutting of hair rendered void the previous period of nazirite observance, while consuming products of the vine did not. Products of the vine had a stringency that defilement or cutting of hair did not, as the prohibition of products of the vine had no exception, while the law allowed exceptions for where cutting of hair was a religious duty or where there was an abandoned corpse. Defilement also had a stringency that cutting of hair did not, as defilement rendered void the whole of the preceding period and entails the offering of a sacrifice, while cutting of hair renders voided only 30 days and did not entail a sacrifice.

And the Sifre reasoned that just as the High Priest was required nonetheless to become unclean to see to the burial of a neglected corpse (met mitzvah), so too was the nazirite required to become unclean to see to the burial of a neglected corpse.

One could (1) plow with an ox and a donkey yoked together (in violation of ) (2 and 3) that are two animals dedicated to the sanctuary, (4) plowing mixed seeds sown in a vineyard (in violation of ), (5) during a Sabbatical year (in violation of ), (6) on a Festival-day (in violation of, for example), (7) when the plower is a priest (in violation of ) and (8) a nazirite (in violation of ) plowing in a contaminated place. They said to him that this would not be in the same category as the other violations. He replied that neither is the nazirite in the same category as the other violations.

The Mishnah taught that they buried the cut hair of a nazirite.

Queen Helena of Adiabene converted to Judaism. When her son went to war, she vowed that if he returned in peace, she would be a nazirite for seven years. Her son did return, and she observed her nazirite vow for seven years. At the end of the seven years, she went to the Land of Israel and the House of Hillel ruled that she had to be a nazirite for seven more years. Towards the end of this seven years, she contracted ritual defilement, and so altogether she was a nazirite for 21 years. Rabbi Judah said that she was a nazirite for only 14 years (plus 30 days). If a person vowed a naziriteship of long duration and completed it and then arrives in the Land of Israel, the House of Shammai taught that the person would then need to be a nazirite for 30 more days, but House of Hillel taught that the person's naziriteship began for its full term again as at the first.

In the Mishnah, the Sages related of Miriam of Tarmod that one kind of blood was sprinkled on her behalf when she was told that her daughter was dangerously ill. She went and found her daughter had died (and thus Miriam became accidentally unclean), and the Sages told her to offer her remaining sacrifices after purification.

Just as Scripture uses "razor" (morah) in the case of Samson to show that he was a nazirite, so Scripture must use "razor" (morah) in the case of Samuel to show that he was a nazirite.

Rabbi Eleazar ha-Kappar taught that  required priests to "make atonement for" nazirites because the nazirites denied themselves wine. Rabbi Eleazar ha-Kappar thus reasoned that if nazirites were considered sinners because they denied themselves wine, then those who fast voluntarily or deprive themselves of other things are sinners, too. But Rabbi Eleazar said that the nazirite was termed "holy," as  says, "he shall be holy, he shall let the locks of the hair of his head grow long." Rabbi Eleazar thus reasoned that if nazirites were considered holy because they denied themselves just wine, then those who fast voluntarily are holy, too.

It was taught in a Baraita that Rabbi Judah taught that the early pious ones were eager to bring a sin-offering, because God never caused them to sin. So they made a free-will nazirite vow to God, so as to be able to bring a sin-offering. But Rabbi Simeon taught that the early pious ones did not make nazirite vows. They would bring offerings freely, but they did not take nazirite vows, so as not to be designated sinners. For  says, "And [the priest] shall make atonement for him, for that he sinned against a soul."

Abaye summarized that Simeon the Just, Rabbi Simeon, and Rabbi Eleazar ha-Kappar all came to the same conclusion — that a nazirite was a sinner. The Gemara questioned whether  might refer only to a nazirite who became unclean. But the Gemara concluded that  says that the priest must "make atonement" because the nazirite who became unclean sinned twice (both by becoming a nazirite at all and by defiling his nazirite vow).

Similarly, Rav taught that a person will have to give account on the judgment day for every good permissible thing that the person might have enjoyed and did not.

Similarly, Hillel the Elder taught that washing one's body in the bath-house was a religious duty. For if the statues of kings, which were inscribed in theatres and circuses, were scoured and washed by the person appointed to look after them, how much more should a person, who has been created in the Image and Likeness of God, as  says, "For in the image of God made He man." A Midrash thus taught that , "The merciful man does good to his own soul," applies to this teaching of Hillel the Elder.

The Gemara taught that there were three who were required to cut their hair, and whose hair cutting was a religious duty: nazirites (as stated in ), those afflicted with skin disease (metzora, as stated in ), and the Levites. Citing the Mishnah, the Gemara taught that if any of them cut their hair without a razor, or left behind two hairs, their act was invalid.

The Priestly Blessing

And for a like reason, the priests do not lift their hands in blessing during the afternoon service because of the possibility of intoxication.

A Tanna taught that the first of Nisan took ten crowns of distinction by virtue of the ten momentous events that occurred on that day.

The Mishnah taught that the priests recited the Priestly Blessing of  every day.

The Mishnah taught that in the province of Judea outside the Temple, the priests would say the Priestly Blessing as three blessings, but in the Temple, they would say it as one single blessing. In the Temple, the priests would pronounce the Name of God as it is written, but outside the Temple they would say its substituted form. In the province, the priests raised their hands at the height of their shoulders, but in the Temple, the priests raised their hands above their heads, except the High Priest, who did not raise his hands higher than the frontlet on his forehead. Rabbi Judah said that even the High Priest raised his hands higher than the frontlet, as  reports, “And Aaron lifted up his hands toward the people and blessed them.”

A Midrash taught that great is peace, for the world could not be maintained except by peace, and the Torah is wholly peace, as  says, "Her ways are ways of pleasantness, and all her paths are peace." The reading of the Shema concludes (in the Evening, Maariv, Prayer Service) with the words: "He spreads the tabernacle of peace over His people." The Amidah prayer concludes with peace. Rabbi Simeon ben Halafta observed that there is no vessel that holds a blessing save peace, as  says, "The Lord will give strength to His people; the Lord will bless His people with peace."

In a Baraita, Rabbi Ishmael interpreted , “In this way you shall bless the children of Israel,” to report the priests' blessing of Israel, and Rabbi Ishmael interpreted , “And I will bless them,” to mean that God then blesses the priests. Rabbi Akiva, however, interpreted , “And I will bless them,” to mean that when the priests bless Israel, God affirms their blessing of Israel.

Rabbi Nathan interpreted it to mean may God bless you with regards to your possessions and guard you with regard to your person.

Rabbi Isaac asked whether those blessed are not automatically guarded, and those guarded are not blessed. Rabbi Isaac thus interpreted “guard you” to mean from the Evil Inclinaion, that it not drive you out of the world. Another Midrash interpreted “guard you” to mean that others have no dominion over you. Another Midrash interpreted “The Lord . . . keep you” to pray that God would keep the covenant that God made with Israel's forefathers, as  says, “The Lord your God shall keep with you the covenant . . . .” Another Midrash interpreted “keep you” to mean that God will keep your soul at the hour of death.

Numbers chapter 7
Aaron intended to delay the people until Moses came down, but Moses thought that Aaron was participating in the sin and was incensed with him. So God told Moses that God knew that Aaron's intentions were good. The Midrash compared this to a prince who became mentally unstable and started digging to undermine his father's house. His tutor told him not to weary himself but to let him dig. When the king saw it, he said that he knew the tutor's intentions were good, and declared that the tutor would rule over the palace. So God told Aaron that God knew Aaron's intention, and that only Aaron would have sovereignty over the sacrifices that the Israelites would bring. Rabbi Levi compared it to the friend of a king who was a member of the imperial cabinet and a judge. When the king was about to appoint a palace governor, he told his friend that he intended to appoint the friend's brother.

The Midrash concluded that when  reports that "Moses sent . . . Phinehas the son of Eleazar the priest to the war with the holy vessels," it refers to the Ark of the Covenant, to which  refers when it says, "the service of the holy things."

Rabbi Simeon bar Abba in the name of Rabbi Joḥanan taught that every time Scripture uses the expression “and it was” (vayechi), it intimates the coming of either trouble or joy. If it intimates trouble, there is no trouble to compare with it, and if it intimates joy, there is no joy to compare with it. Rabbi Samuel bar Nahman made a distinction: In every instance where Scripture employs “and it was” (vayechi), it introduces trouble, while when Scripture employs “and it shall be” (vehayah), it introduces joy. The Sages raised an objection to Rabbi Samuel's view, noting that to introduce the offerings of the princes,  says, “And he that presented his offering . . . was (vayechi),” and surely that was a positive thing. Rabbi Samuel replied that the occasion of the princes’ gifts did not indicate joy, because it was manifest to God that the princes would join with Korah in his dispute (as reported in ). Rabbi Judah ben Rabbi Simon said in the name of Rabbi Levi ben Parta that the case could be compared to that of a member of the palace who committed a theft in the bathhouse, and the attendant, while afraid of disclosing his name, nevertheless made him known by describing him as a certain young man dressed in white. Similarly, although  does not explicitly mention the names of the princes who sided with Korah in his dispute,  nevertheless refers to them when it says, “They were princes of the congregation, the elect men of the assembly, men of renown,” and this recalls , “These were the elect of the congregation, the princes of the tribes of their fathers . . . ,” where the text lists their names. They were the “men of renown” whose names were mentioned in connection with the standards; as  says, “These are the names of the men who shall stand with you, of Reuben, Elizur the son of Shedeur; of Simeon, Shelumiel the son of Zurishaddai . . . .”

And the Midrash taught that this number was alluded to when (as  reports) the prince of the Tribe of Simeon brought an offering of "one silver dish, the weight of which was 130 shekels." The Midrash taught that the dish was an allusion to the court that encompassed the Tabernacle as the sea encompasses the world.

Rabbi Phinehas ben Yair taught that the 60 rams, 60 goats, and 60 lambs that  reports that the Israelites sacrificed as a dedication-offering of the altar symbolized (among other things) the 60 cities of the region of Argob that  reports the Israelites conquered.

Rabbi Azariah in the name of Rabbi Judah ben Rabbi Simon taught that the mode of conversation between God and Moses in the tent of meeting reported in  reflected that Israel had outgrown the infancy of its nationhood. Rabbi Azariah in the name of Rabbi Judah ben Rabbi Simon explained in a parable. A mortal king had a daughter whom he loved exceedingly. So long as his daughter was small, he would speak with her in public or in the courtyard. When she grew up and reached puberty, the king determined that it no longer befit his daughter's dignity for him to converse with her in public. So he directed that a pavilion be made for her so that he could speak with his daughter inside the pavilion. In the same way, when God saw the Israelites in Egypt, they were in the childhood of their nationhood, as  says, "When Israel was a child, then I loved him, and out of Egypt I called My son." When God saw the Israelites at Sinai, God spoke with them as  says, "The Lord spoke with you face to face." As soon as they received the Torah, became God's nation, and said (as reported in ), "All that the Lord has spoken will we do, and obey," God observed that it was no longer in keeping with the dignity of God's children that God should converse with them in the open. So God instructed the Israelites to make a Tabernacle, and when God needed to communicate with the Israelites, God did so from the Tabernacle. And thus  bears this out when it says, "And when Moses went into the tent of meeting that He might speak with him."

In medieval Jewish interpretation
The parashah is discussed in these medieval Jewish sources:

Numbers chapter 4
 refers to duties of the Levites. Maimonides and the siddur report that the Levites would recite the Psalm for the Day in the Temple.

Numbers chapter 5
Maimonides read  to teach that if a person violates any one of the commandments of the Torah (whether positive or negative, presumptuously or erroneously), when the person repents and turns away from the sinful way, the person is obliged to confess before God. Maimonides taught that one makes such a verbal confession by saying: "I beseech You, O Great Name! I have sinned; I have been obstinate; I have committed profanity against You, particularly in doing thus and such. Now, behold! I have repented and am ashamed of my actions; forever will I not relapse into this thing again." Maimonides taught that this is the elementary form of confession, but whoever elaborates in confessing and extends this subject is praiseworthy.

Maimonides taught that if a man had engaged in forbidden relations from the time that he attained the age of majority onward, the curse-bearing waters of  did not test the fidelity of his wife. Even if he engaged in relations with his fiancé while she was living in her father's house (which the Rabbis prohibited) the waters did not test the fidelity of his wife. Maimonides taught that  implied that only when the man was "free of sin," "the woman will bear [the burden of] her sin."

Numbers chapter 6

The Nazirite
Maimonides wrote that the law in  prohibiting the nazirite from eating anything made from the grape vine was an additional precaution, implying that people must consume wine only as much as is absolutely necessary. For  calls those who abstain from drinking wine "holy" — equal to the sanctity of the High Priest — an honor given nazirites because they abstain from wine.

Maimonides taught that nazirite vows must be observed even after the destruction of the Temple. Therefore, when a person takes a nazirite vow in the present era, that person must observe it forever, because there is no Temple where the person can go to offer sacrifices at the conclusion of the nazirite vow. Maimonides wrote that a nazirite vow may be observed only in the Land of Israel (as the Sages decreed that the Diaspora conveys ritual impurity, and a nazirite thus cannot observe the vow there). A person who takes a nazirite vow in the Diaspora is penalized and obligated to go to the Land of Israel and observe the nazirite vow there for the length of the vow. Accordingly, a person who takes a nazirite vow in the Diaspora in the present era is compelled to go to the Land of Israel and observe the nazirite vow there until death or until the Temple is rebuilt. (Abraham ben David (The Ra'avad), however, questioned what purpose would be served by going to the Land of Israel in the present era, as all are impure, even there, because of contact with a human corpse (or the impurity that results from a corpse) and there are no ashes from a red heifer with which we can purify ourselves. Hence, the Ra'avad concluded that it is forbidden to take a nazirite vow in the present era, whether in the Diaspora or in the Land of Israel.) Maimonides taught that throughout the entire time that a nazirite is in the Diaspora, it is forbidden to drink wine, to become impure due to contact with the dead, and to cut one's hair. The nazirite must uphold all of the requirements stemming from a nazirite vow, despite the fact that the days do not count in the Diaspora. One who transgresses by drinking wine, cutting hair, or touching a corpse would be liable for lashes. Maimonides wrote that a person who says, "I will be a nazirite if I do this and this" or "if I do not do this or this," is a wicked person. But Maimonides argued that a person who takes a nazirite vow to God in a holy manner is delightful and praiseworthy, for concerning this,  says, "The diadem of his God is upon his head. ... He is holy to God," and Scripture equates him with a prophet, as  says, "And from your sons, I will raise [some] as prophets, and from your youths, [some] as nazirites."

But Maimonides also wrote that if one considers envy, desire, vainglory, and like as evil tendencies and resolves to separate oneself from them exceedingly and eschew meat, wine, marrying, comfortable quarters, comfortable clothes, and the like, such is an evil way and is forbidden. Maimonides wrote that one who follows this way is called a sinner. Therefore, the sages commanded that people must not deprive themselves of anything other than the things of which the Torah deprives them, nor shall they bind themselves by vows and oaths to abstain from things that are permitted.

The Priestly Blessing
The Baal HaTurim concluded that this hints at the Mishnaic dictum (in Avot 4:15) that one should always reach out to be the first to greet any person, even an adversary.

The Zohar found in the Priestly Blessing of  components of God's essential Name. In the Zohar, Rabbi Simeon taught from the Book of Mystery that the Divine Name has both a revealed and a concealed form. In its revealed form, it is written as the four-letter Name of God, the Tetragrammaton, but in its undisclosed form it is written in other letters, and this undisclosed form represents the most Recondite of all. In the Zohar, Rabbi Judah taught that even the revealed form of the Name is hidden under other letters (as the name ADoNaY, is hidden within ADNY) in order to screen the most Recondite of all. They all combine in one composite Name. When people were more reverent, the priests openly enunciated the Name in the hearing of all, but after irreverence became widespread, the Name became concealed under other letters. At the time when the Name was disclosed, the priest would concentrate his mind on its deep and inner meaning, and he would utter the Name in such a way as to accord with that meaning. But when irreverence became common in the world, he would conceal all within the written letters. It is for this reason that  says simply "saying" (amor), instead of the imperative form "say" (imri), in a reference to the hidden letters within the words of the Priestly Blessing. The word , amor has in its letters the numerical value of 248 minus one ( equals 1;  equals 40;  equals 6;  equals 200; and 1 + 40 + 6 + 200 = 247), equal to the number of a man's bodily parts, excepting the one part on which all the rest depend.

In modern interpretation
The parashah is discussed in these modern sources:

Numbers chapter 5
Professor Amy Kalmanofsky of the Jewish Theological Seminary reported that  has elicited a wide range of reactions, from viewing the ritual to be unforgivably misogynistic, demonstrating women's vulnerability and men's privileged position in Israelite society, to believing that the ritual worked to protect accused women.

Professor Tamara Cohn Eskenazi of the Hebrew Union College-Jewish Institute of Religion noted that the Torah makes no mention of, and provides no procedure for, the man whom the husband necessarily must have suspected of having been with his wife.

Professor Sharon Keller of Hofstra University understood  to mean that an innocent wife would be able to maintain her pregnancy. Keller saw the sotah ritual as involving a pregnant woman whose husband suspected that he was not the father.

Professor Ishay Rosen Zvi of Tel Aviv University argued that the Mishnaic Sotah ritual was never practiced in the manner the Mishnah prescribed.

Numbers chapter 6
The 17th-century Dutch philosopher Baruch Spinoza read  to relate that Melchizedek was king of Jerusalem and priest of the Most High God, that in the exercise of his priestly functions — like those  describes — he blessed Abraham, and that Abraham gave to this priest of God a tithe of all his spoils. Spinoza deduced from this that before God founded the Israelite nation, God constituted kings and priests in Jerusalem, and ordained for them rites and laws. Spinoza deduced that while Abraham sojourned in the city, he lived scrupulously according to these laws, for Abraham had received no special rites from God; and yet  reports that he observed the worship, precepts, statutes, and laws of God, which Spinoza interpreted to mean the worship, statutes, precepts, and laws of king Melchizedek.

In critical analysis
Some scholars who follow the Documentary Hypothesis attribute all of the text of the parashah to the Priestly source who wrote in the 6th or 5th century BCE.

Commandments
According to Sefer ha-Chinuch, there are 7 positive and 11 negative commandments in the parashah.
To send the impure from the Temple
Impure people must not enter the Temple.
To repent and confess wrongdoings
To fulfill the laws of the sotah
Not to put oil on the sotah's meal offering
Not to put frankincense on the sotah's meal offering
The nazarite must not drink wine, wine mixtures, or wine vinegar.
The nazarite must not eat fresh grapes.
The nazarite must not eat raisins.
The nazarite must not eat grape seeds.
The nazarite must not eat grape skins.
The nazarite must not cut his or her hair.
The nazarite must let his or her hair grow.
The nazarite must not be under the same roof as a corpse.
The nazarite must not come into contact with the dead.
The nazarite must shave after bringing sacrifices upon completion of the nazirite period.
The Kohanim must bless the Jewish nation daily.
The Levites must transport the ark on their shoulders.

In the liturgy

Many Jews recite the Priestly Blessing, as the first section of the Torah to which they turn after reciting the Blessings of the Torah in the morning. And the Priestly Blessing is reflected in the closing prayer for peace of the Amidah prayer in each of the three prayer services.

Haftarah

Summary of the haftarah
Manoah's wife was barren, but an angel of the Lord appeared and told her that she would bear a son. The angel warned her not to drink wine or strong drink or eat any unclean thing, and foretold that no razor would come upon her son's head, for he would be nazirite from birth and would begin to save Israel from the Philistines.

Manoah was told by his wife what happened, and Manoah entreated God to let the man of God come again and teach them what to do. God heeded Manoah and sent the angel to the woman as she sat alone in the field. Manoah's wife ran and told Manoah, and he followed her to the angel, and asked him whether he was the one who had spoken to his wife, and he said that he was. Manoah asked the angel how they should raise the child, and the angel told him that they should do what he had told Manoah's wife: She was not to eat any product of the grapevine, drink wine or strong drink, or eat any unclean thing.

Manoah asked the angel to stay so that they could serve him a meal. But the angel told Manoah that even if he stayed, he would not eat, and if they wanted to make a burnt-offering, they should offer it to God. Manoah did not recognize that he was an angel, and asked him for his name so that when his prophecy proved true, they could honor him. But the angel asked why Manoah asked for his name, as it was hidden.

So Manoah offered to God a young goat and a meal-offering, and as the flame went up off the altar toward heaven, the angel ascended in the flame and disappeared, and Manoah and his wife fell on their faces, as Manoah realized that he was an angel. Manoah told his wife that they would surely die, as they had seen God, but she replied that if God had wanted to kill them, God would not have received the burnt-offering or shown them what God did.

And the woman bore a son and called him Samson, and the child grew, and God blessed him, and the God's spirit began to move him in Mahaneh-dan, between Zorah and Eshtaol.

Connection between the haftarah and the parashah
Both the parashah and the haftarah relate to the nazirite status.

Both the parashah and the haftarah speak of abstention from "wine and strong drink." And both the parashah and the haftarah note that "no razor shall come upon his head."

The parashah and the haftarah do differ, however, about some aspects of the nazirite status. While the parashah addresses one voluntarily becoming a nazirite, the haftarah speaks of one committed by another to nazirite status from birth. And while the parashah contemplates the nazirite period coming to a close, the haftarah envisions a lifetime commitment.

In his career after the haftarah, Samson proceeded to violate each of the three nazirite prohibitions. He apparently consumed intoxicants, frequently came in contact with the dead, and ultimately allowed his hair to be cut.

The haftarah in classical rabbinic interpretation
The Gemara taught that Samson's mother was named Zelelponith. The Gemara taught that the oral tradition passed along this fact to provide a reply to the heretics (should they ask why the written Torah does not supply the name of the mother of such an important figure).

Notes

Further reading
The parashah has parallels or is discussed in these sources:

Ancient
Code of Hammurabi ¶ 132. Babylonia, Circa 1780 BCE. In e.g. Ancient Near Eastern Texts Relating to the Old Testament. Edited by James B. Pritchard, pages 163, 171. Princeton: Princeton University Press, 1969. (ordeal of suspected wife).
The Priestly Benediction on a silver amulet. Ketef Hinnom, Jerusalem, Late 7th century BCE.

Biblical
 (Joseph "one whose hair is dedicated," , nezir echav).
 (untrimmed locks);  (Samson the nazirite);  (Samson the nazirite).
 (Samuel the nazirite).
 (cherubim);  (symbolic consumption of the written word);  (burning of hair);  (cherubim).
 (nazirites).
Psalms  (cherubim);  (burnt offerings);  (blessing of God's presence);  (God vindicates the just cause);  (sacrifices);  (sacrifices of thanksgiving);  (sacrifices);  (burnt offerings);  (God be gracious; God's face to shine);  (God's dwelling);  (God's face to shine);  (peace);  (cherubim);  (curse entering body like water);  (the Lord keep you);  (the Lord bless you);  (incense).

Early nonrabbinic
Philo. Allegorical Interpretation 1: 7:17; Allegorical Interpretation 3: 3:8, 51:148; On the Cherubim 5:14, 17; On the Unchangeableness of God 19:87, 89; On Husbandry 40:174; Concerning Noah's Work as a Planter 25:108; Who Is the Heir of Divine Things? 41:195; On Mating with the Preliminary Studies 21:114; On Dreams, That They Are God-Sent 2:4:25; The Special Laws 1:46:254. Alexandria, Egypt, early 1st century CE. In, e.g., The Works of Philo: Complete and Unabridged, New Updated Edition. Translated by Charles Duke Yonge, pages 26, 51, 67, 81, 165, 189, 200, 292, 314, 389, 558. Peabody, Massachusetts: Hendrickson Publishers, 1993. .
Josephus, Antiquities of the Jews 3:11:1, 3, 6; 4:4:4. Circa 93–94. In, e.g., The Works of Josephus: Complete and Unabridged, New Updated Edition. Translated by William Whiston, pages 96–97, 106–07. Peabody, Massachusetts: Hendrickson Publishers, 1987. .
Luke  Circa 80–150 CE. (John the Baptist a nazirite).
Gospel of James 16 (circa 150 CE). (Mary as sotah).
Acts  2nd century. (Paul paying for nazirites to conclude their observance).

Classical rabbinic
Mishnah: Challah 1:6, 4:11; Orlah 1:7–8; Sukkah 4:1, 9–10; Megillah 3:6, 4:10; Moed Katan 3:1; Nazir 1:1–9:5; Sotah 1:1–9:15; Bava Kamma 9:5–12; Makkot 3:7–10; Avodah Zarah 5:9; Avot 5:21; Menachot 3:5–6; 5:3, 6; 6:1, 5; Chullin 13:10; Temurah 7:4; Meilah 3:2; Tamid 5:1, 7:2; Middot 2:5; Kinnim 1:1–3:6; Negaim 14:4; Parah 1:4; Niddah 5:6. Land of Israel, circa 200 CE. In, e.g., The Mishnah: A New Translation. Translated by Jacob Neusner, pages 75, 149, 158, 160, 286, 288, 321, 324, 327, 430–66, 524–26, 618, 672, 739, 742–44, 764, 835, 855–56, 869, 871, 876, 883–89, 1010, 1014, 1085. New Haven: Yale University Press, 1988. .
Tosefta: Demai 2:7; Maaser Sheni 3:11; Challah 2:8; Pisha (Pesachim) 8:9; Shekalim 3:16; Nedarim 1:1; Nazir 1:1–6:6; Sotah 1:1–15:15; Gittin 2:7; Bava Kamma 9:19, 10:1–5, 17–18; Makkot 3:5; Negaim 1:12; 4:12. Land of Israel, circa 250 CE. In, e.g., The Tosefta: Translated from the Hebrew, with a New Introduction. Translated by Jacob Neusner, volume 1, pages 85, 313, 339, 510, 538, 785, 807–93, 901; volume 2, pages 1005, 1008–10, 1013–14, 1207, 1712, 1725. Peabody, Massachusetts: Hendrickson Publishers, 2002. .
Sifre to Numbers 1–58. Land of Israel, circa 250–350 CE. In, e.g., Sifré to Numbers: An American Translation and Explanation. Translated by Jacob Neusner, volume 1, pages 47–230. Atlanta: Scholars Press, 1986. .
Sifra 45:1; 46:1; 47:1; 50:1; 51:2; 55:1; 63:2; 66:1; 77:1; 79:1; 81:1; 85:1; 87:1; 95:1; 101:1; 105:1; 188:3; 213:1; 230:1. Land of Israel, 4th century CE. In, e.g., Sifra: An Analytical Translation. Translated by Jacob Neusner, volume 1, pages 255, 259, 265, 273, 277, 292, 318, 332; volume 2, pages 29, 37, 43–44, 57–58, 63, 97, 145, 158–59; 3:55, 175, 237. Atlanta: Scholars Press, 1988. Vol. 1 . Vol. 2 . Vol. 3 .
Jerusalem Talmud: Demai 55b; Orlah 14b, 28a; Shabbat 5b; Pesachim 60a–b, 68b; Yoma 4b–5a, 50b; Sukkah 3b; Taanit 20b; Megillah 40b; Chagigah 21b; Yevamot 54b, 57a–b; Nedarim 1a, 3a–b, 39b; Nazir 1a–53a; Sotah 1a–52a; Gittin 31b; Kiddushin 18a; Bava Kamma 2b, 36b–37a; Sanhedrin 3b; Shevuot 5b, 26b; Horayot 13a. Tiberias, Land of Israel, circa 400 CE. In, e.g., Talmud Yerushalmi. Edited by Chaim Malinowitz, Yisroel Simcha Schorr, and Mordechai Marcus, volumes 4, 12–13, 19, 21–22, 25–27, 30, 33–37, 39–41, 44, 46, 49. Brooklyn: Mesorah Publications, 2007–2019. And in, e.g., The Jerusalem Talmud: A Translation and Commentary. Edited by Jacob Neusner and translated by Jacob Neusner, Tzvee Zahavy, B. Barry Levy, and Edward Goldman. Peabody, Massachusetts: Hendrickson Publishers, 2009.
Genesis Rabbah 3:9; 42:3; 43:8; 50:11; 53:6; 66:2; 72:5; 91:3; 97 (NV); 97:5. Land of Israel, 5th century. In, e.g., Midrash Rabbah: Genesis. Translated by Harry Freedman and Maurice Simon, volume 1, pages 25–26, 341–345, 357–58, 440–42, 466; volume 2, 601, 664–65, 833–36, 896–902, 942 (twice). London: Soncino Press, 1939. .
Mekhilta of Rabbi Simeon 10:1; 58:1; 83:1. Land of Israel, 5th century. In, e.g., Mekhilta de-Rabbi Shimon bar Yohai. Translated by W. David Nelson, pages 29, 259, 375. Philadelphia: Jewish Publication Society, 2006. .

Babylonian Talmud: Berakhot 15b, 19a–b, 20b, 31b, 40b, 63a; Shabbat 13a, 28a, 50b, 71b, 87b, 92a, 116a, 118b, 132a, 139a; Eruvin 13a–b, 26b, 58a, 104b; Pesachim 19a, 23a, 31a, 35a, 41b, 43a–b, 45a, 66b–67a, 79a, 80b, 81b, 95b, 110a; Yoma 4b, 16a, 37a–b, 47a, 61b, 76b; Sukkah 6a, 28a, 42a, 53b; Beitzah 20a, 35b; Rosh Hashanah 17b; Taanit 11a, 17a, 21b, 26b; Megillah 3b, 8b, 18a, 20b, 23a–b, 25a, 28b, 29b, 30b–31a; Moed Katan 9a, 13b, 15a, 17b, 18b, 19b, 25b; Chagigah 6a, 9a, 10a, 16a, 23b–24a; Yevamot 5a, 7a, 11a–b, 38b, 46a, 49b, 55b, 56b, 58a, 61b, 84b–85b, 95a–b, 100b; Ketubot 9a, 15b, 19a, 24b, 45b, 51b, 71a, 72a, 74a, 81a, 82a; Nedarim 3a, 4a, 9b–10a, 18a, 66b, 73a, 82b–83a; Nazir 2a–66b; Sotah 2a–49b; Gittin 37a, 60a; Kiddushin 15a, 27b, 35a, 36b, 57b, 62a, 80b; Bava Kamma 15a, 40b, 91b, 103b, 105a–06a, 109a–10b, 111a; Bava Batra 121b; Sanhedrin 10b, 16b, 22b, 32b, 35a, 45a, 66a, 68b, 86a, 87a; Makkot 11a–b, 13b, 14b–15a, 17a, 18b, 20b–21b, 22b; Shevuot 5a, 6b, 8a, 13a, 14b–15a, 16a, 17a–b, 22a–23a, 27b–28a, 29b, 32a, 33b, 35b–36a, 37a, 39a, 48b–49a; Avodah Zarah 6b, 17a, 44a, 74a; Horayot 9a, 12b; Zevachim 4b, 6b, 8a, 9b, 23b, 33b, 36a, 44b, 48b, 54b–55a, 59b, 88a, 89b–90b, 100a, 101b, 117a–b; Menachot 2a, 3a, 4a–b, 8a–b, 16a, 18a–19b, 27a, 34a, 44a, 46b–47a, 48b, 50a, 55b, 57b, 59a, 60b, 68b, 72b, 78a, 84b, 88a–b, 91a–b, 92b, 95b, 103a, 109a; Chullin 9b, 24a–b, 41b, 49a, 82b, 88b, 89b, 98a, 131a, 133a–b, 134b, 141a; Arakhin 11a, 21a, 28b, 34a; Temurah 2b, 10a, 12b, 34a; Keritot 2b, 4a, 9a–b, 10b, 12b, 13b, 24a, 25b–26a, 27b; Meilah 11a, 18a, 19a; Tamid 33b; Niddah 3a, 28b–29a, 46a, 48b, 52a, 68b, 70b. Sasanian Empire, 6th century. In, e.g., Talmud Bavli. Edited by Yisroel Simcha Schorr, Chaim Malinowitz, and Mordechai Marcus, 72 volumes. Brooklyn: Mesorah Pubs., 2006.

Medieval
Solomon ibn Gabirol. A Crown for the King, 21:257–58. Spain, 11th century. Translated by David R. Slavitt, pages 34–35. New York: Oxford University Press, 1998. .

Rashi. Commentary. Numbers 4–7. Troyes, France, late 11th century. In, e.g., Rashi. The Torah: With Rashi's Commentary Translated, Annotated, and Elucidated. Translated and annotated by Yisrael Isser Zvi Herczeg, volume 4, pages 35–85. Brooklyn: Mesorah Publications, 1997. .

Rashbam. Commentary on the Torah. Troyes, early 12th century. In, e.g., Rashbam's Commentary on Leviticus and Numbers: An Annotated Translation. Edited and translated by Martin I. Lockshin, pages 167–79. Providence: Brown Judaic Studies, 2001. .
Judah Halevi. Kuzari. 2:26; 3:53. Toledo, Spain, 1130–1140. In, e.g., Jehuda Halevi. Kuzari: An Argument for the Faith of Israel. Introduction by Henry Slonimsky, pages 105, 181. New York: Schocken, 1964. .
Numbers Rabbah 1:1; 2:10; 3:12; 4:19–20; 6:1–14:22; 15:3, 5, 8; 18:3, 20–21; 20:19; 21:12; 22:4. 12th century. In, e.g., Midrash Rabbah: Numbers. Translated by Judah J. Slotki, volume 5, pages 8, 36, 90, 119, 124, 138, 157–484; volume 6, pages 485–641, 644, 646, 649, 710, 732, 735, 810, 838, 856. London: Soncino Press, 1939. .
Abraham ibn Ezra. Commentary on the Torah. Mid-12th century. In, e.g., Ibn Ezra's Commentary on the Pentateuch: Numbers (Ba-Midbar). Translated and annotated by H. Norman Strickman and Arthur M. Silver, pages 31–55. New York: Menorah Publishing Company, 1999. .
Maimonides. Mishneh Torah: Hilchot Yesodei HaTorah (The Laws that Are the Foundations of the Torah), chapter 7, ¶ 6. Egypt. Circa 1170–1180. In, e.g., Mishneh Torah: Hilchot Yesodei HaTorah: The Laws which Are the Foundations of the Torah. Translated by Eliyahu Touger, volume 1. New York: Moznaim Publishing, 1989. .

Maimonides. Mishneh Torah: Hilchot De'ot (The Laws of Personality Development), chapter 3, ¶ 1. Egypt. Circa 1170–1180. In, e.g., Mishneh Torah: Hilchot De'ot: The Laws of Personality Development: and Hilchot Talmud Torah: The Laws of Torah Study. Translated by Za'ev Abramson and Eliyahu Touger, volume 2, pages 50–55. New York: Moznaim Publishing, 1989.
Maimonides. Mishneh Torah: Hilchot Teshuvah (The Laws of Repentance), chapter 1, ¶ 1. Egypt. Circa 1170–1180. In, e.g., Mishneh Torah: Hilchot Teshuvah: The Laws of Repentance. Translated by Eliyahu Touger, pages 2–3. New York: Moznaim, Publishing, 1990.
Maimonides. Mishneh Torah: Hilchot Sotah (The Laws of a Sotah). Egypt. Circa 1170–1180. In, e.g., Mishneh Torah: Hilchot Yibbum Va'Chalitzah (The Laws of Yibbum and Chalitzah): and Hilchot Na'arah Betulah (The Laws of a Virgin Maiden): and Hilchot Sotah (The Laws Pertaining to a Sotah). Translated by Eliyahu Touger, volume 18, pages 186–237. New York: Moznaim Publishing, 1995. .
Maimonides. Mishneh Torah: Hilchot Nezirut (The Laws of the Nazirite). Egypt. Circa 1170–1180. In, e.g., Mishneh Torah: Sefer Hafla'ah: The Book of Utterances. Translated by Eliyahu Touger. New York: Moznaim Publishing, 2003. .
Maimonides. The Guide for the Perplexed, part 1, chapters 37, 61; part 3, chapters 33, 46, 47, 48. Cairo, Egypt, 1190. In, e.g., Moses Maimonides. The Guide for the Perplexed. Translated by Michael Friedländer, pages 53, 90–91, 327, 364, 366, 370, 372. New York: Dover Publications, 1956. .

Hezekiah ben Manoah. Hizkuni. France, circa 1240. In, e.g., Chizkiyahu ben Manoach. Chizkuni: Torah Commentary. Translated and annotated by Eliyahu Munk, volume 3, pages 860–79. Jerusalem: Ktav Publishers, 2013. .
Nachmanides. Commentary on the Torah. Jerusalem, circa 1270. In, e.g., Ramban (Nachmanides): Commentary on the Torah: Numbers. Translated by Charles B. Chavel, volume 4, pages 37–67. New York: Shilo Publishing House, 1975. .
Zohar, part 1, pages 120b, 199b, 211a, 248a; part 2, pages 6a, 24b, 75b, 79b, 107b, 140b, 221b; part 3, pages 38a, 121a–148b, 189a. Spain, late 13th century. In, e.g., The Zohar. Translated by Harry Sperling and Maurice Simon. 5 volumes. London: Soncino Press, 1934.
Jacob ben Asher (Baal Ha-Turim). Rimze Ba'al ha-Turim. Early 14th century. In, e.g., Baal Haturim Chumash: Bamidbar/Numbers. Translated by Eliyahu Touger, edited and annotated by Avie Gold, volume 4, pages 1389–441. Brooklyn: Mesorah Publications, 2003. .
Jacob ben Asher. Perush Al ha-Torah. Early 14th century. In, e.g., Yaakov ben Asher. Tur on the Torah. Translated and annotated by Eliyahu Munk, volume 3, pages 1025–44. Jerusalem: Lambda Publishers, 2005. .
Isaac ben Moses Arama. Akedat Yizhak (The Binding of Isaac). Late 15th century. In, e.g., Yitzchak Arama. Akeydat Yitzchak: Commentary of Rabbi Yitzchak Arama on the Torah. Translated and condensed by Eliyahu Munk, volume 2, pages 691–99. New York, Lambda Publishers, 2001. .

Modern
Isaac Abravanel. Commentary on the Torah. Italy, between 1492–1509. In, e.g., Abarbanel: Selected Commentaries on the Torah: Volume 4: Bamidbar/Numbers. Translated and annotated by Israel Lazar, pages 45–71. Brooklyn: CreateSpace, 2015. .
Obadiah ben Jacob Sforno. Commentary on the Torah. Venice, 1567. In, e.g., Sforno: Commentary on the Torah. Translation and explanatory notes by Raphael Pelcovitz, pages 660–81. Brooklyn: Mesorah Publications, 1997. .
Moshe Alshich. Commentary on the Torah. Safed, circa 1593. In, e.g., Moshe Alshich. Midrash of Rabbi Moshe Alshich on the Torah. Translated and annotated by Eliyahu Munk, volume 3, pages 801–13. New York, Lambda Publishers, 2000. .
Avraham Yehoshua Heschel. Commentaries on the Torah. Cracow, Poland, mid 17th century. Compiled as Chanukat HaTorah. Edited by Chanoch Henoch Erzohn. Piotrkow, Poland, 1900. In Avraham Yehoshua Heschel. Chanukas HaTorah: Mystical Insights of Rav Avraham Yehoshua Heschel on Chumash. Translated by Avraham Peretz Friedman, pages 243–46. Southfield, Michigan: Targum Press/Feldheim Publishers, 2004. .

Thomas Hobbes. Leviathan, Review and Conclusion. England, 1651. Reprint edited by C. B. Macpherson, page 725. Harmondsworth, England: Penguin Classics, 1982. .
Shabbethai Bass. Sifsei Chachamim. Amsterdam, 1680. In, e.g., Sefer Bamidbar: From the Five Books of the Torah: Chumash: Targum Okelos: Rashi: Sifsei Chachamim: Yalkut: Haftaros, translated by Avrohom Y. Davis, pages 54–129. Lakewood Township, New Jersey: Metsudah Publications, 2013.

Chaim ibn Attar. Ohr ha-Chaim. Venice, 1742. In Chayim ben Attar. Or Hachayim: Commentary on the Torah. Translated by Eliyahu Munk, volume 4, pages 1358–82. Brooklyn: Lambda Publishers, 1999. .
Samuel David Luzzatto (Shadal). Commentary on the Torah. Padua, 1871. In, e.g., Samuel David Luzzatto. Torah Commentary. Translated and annotated by Eliyahu Munk, volume 3, pages 1018–28. New York: Lambda Publishers, 2012. .
Yehudah Aryeh Leib Alter. Sefat Emet. Góra Kalwaria (Ger), Poland, before 1906. Excerpted in The Language of Truth: The Torah Commentary of Sefat Emet. Translated and interpreted by Arthur Green, pages 225–27. Philadelphia: Jewish Publication Society, 1998. . Reprinted 2012. .

Abraham Isaac Kook. The Lights of Penitence, 5:7. 1925. In Abraham Isaac Kook: the Lights of Penitence, the Moral Principles, Lights of Holiness, Essays, Letters, and Poems. Translated by Ben Zion Bokser, page 55. Mahwah, New Jersey: Paulist Press 1978. .
Alexander Alan Steinbach. Sabbath Queen: Fifty-four Bible Talks to the Young Based on Each Portion of the Pentateuch, pages 110–13. New York: Behrman's Jewish Book House, 1936.
Julius H. Greenstone. Numbers: With Commentary: The Holy Scriptures, pages 33–79. Philadelphia: Jewish Publication Society, 1939. Reprinted by Literary Licensing, 2011. .
I. Mendelsohn. "The Family in the Ancient Near East." Biblical Archaeologist, volume 11 (number 2) (1948).
Michael Fishbane. “Accusations of Adultery: A Study of Law and Scribal Practice in Numbers 5:11–31.” Hebrew Union College Annual, volume 45 (1974): pages 25–45.
Herbert C. Brichto. "The Case of the Śōṭā and a Reconsideration of Biblical 'Law.'" Hebrew Union College Annual, volume 46 (1975): pages 55–70.
Jacob Milgrom. Cult and Conscience: The Asham and the Priestly Doctrine of Repentance. E.J. Brill, 1976. .
Roland de Vaux. "Was There an Israelite Amphictyony?" Biblical Archaeology Review, volume 3 (number 2) (June 1977).
Rebecca T. Alpert. “The Sotah: Rabbinic Attitutdes and the Adulterous Wife.” In Jewish Civilization: Essays and Studies: Jewish Law: Volume 2. Edited by Ronald A. Brauner, pages 33–41. Philadelphia: Reconstructionist Rabbinical College, 1981. ISSN 0191-3034.
Jacob Milgrom. "The Case of the Suspected Adulteress, Numbers 5:11–31: Redaction and Meaning." In The Creation of Sacred Literature. Edited by Richard E. Friedman, pages 69–75. Berkeley: Univ. of California Press, 1981. .
Philip J. Budd. Word Biblical Commentary: Volume 5: Numbers, pages 42–88. Waco, Texas: Word Books, 1984. .
Tikva Frymer-Kensky. “The Strange Case of the Suspected Sotah (Numbers V 11–31).” Vetus Testamentum, volume 34 (number 1) (January 1984): pages 11–26.
Jacob Milgrom. "The Chieftain's Gifts: Numbers, Chapter 7," Hebrew Annual Review, volume 9 (1985): pages 221–225.
Steven D. Fraade. "Ascetical Aspects of Ancient Judaism." In Jewish Spirituality: From the Bible through the Middle Ages. Edited by Arthur Green, pages 253–88. New York: Crossroads, 1986.
Tikva Frymer-Kensky. "The Trial Before God of an Accused Adulteress." Bible Review, volume 2 (number 3) (Fall 1986).
Pinchas H. Peli. Torah Today: A Renewed Encounter with Scripture, pages 161–64. Washington, D.C.: B'nai B'rith Books, 1987. .
Joel Roth. "The Status of Daughters of Kohanim and Leviyim for Aliyot." New York: Rabbinical Assembly, 1989. OH 135:3.1989a. In Responsa: 1980–1990: The Committee on Jewish Law and Standards of the Conservative Movement. Edited by David J. Fine, pages 49, 54, 63 note 22. New York: Rabbinical Assembly, 2005. . (implications for women's participation in aliyot of daughters of priests eating from nazir sacrifices).
Jacob Milgrom. The JPS Torah Commentary: Numbers: The Traditional Hebrew Text with the New JPS Translation, pages 30–59, 343–66. Philadelphia: Jewish Publication Society, 1990. .
Mark S. Smith. The Early History of God: Yahweh and the Other Deities in Ancient Israel, pages 10, 101, 118, 123, 149. New York: HarperSanFrancisco, 1990. .
Baruch A. Levine. Numbers 1–20, volume 4, pages 163–266. New York: Anchor Bible, 1993. .
Mary Douglas. In the Wilderness: The Doctrine of Defilement in the Book of Numbers, pages xix, 84, 103, 108–11, 120–21, 123–24, 126, 129, 137, 147–49, 151, 158, 160, 168, 170, 175, 180–81, 186, 199, 201, 232. Oxford: Oxford University Press, 1993. Reprinted 2004. .
Mayer Rabinowitz. "Women Raise Your Hands." New York: Rabbinical Assembly, 1994. OH 128:2.1994a. In Responsa: 1991–2000: The Committee on Jewish Law and Standards of the Conservative Movement. Edited by Kassel Abelson and David J. Fine, pages 9–12. New York: Rabbinical Assembly, 2002. . (Priestly Blessing).
Stanley Bramnick and Judah Kogen. "Should N'siat Kapayim Include B'not Kohanim?" New York: Rabbinical Assembly, 1994. OH 128:2.1994b. In Responsa: 1991–2000: The Committee on Jewish Law and Standards of the Conservative Movement. Edited by Kassel Abelson and David J. Fine, pages 13–15. New York: Rabbinical Assembly, 2002. . (Priestly Blessing).
Judith S. Antonelli. "Sotah: The Accused Wife." In In the Image of God: A Feminist Commentary on the Torah, pages 336–47. Northvale, New Jersey: Jason Aronson, 1995. .
Ellen Frankel. The Five Books of Miriam: A Woman's Commentary on the Torah, pages 199–206. New York: G. P. Putnam's Sons, 1996. .
Jacob Milgrom. "A Husband's Pride, A Mob's Prejudice: The public ordeal undergone by a suspected adulteress in Numbers 5 was meant not to humiliate her but to protect her." Bible Review, volume 12 (number 4) (August 1996).

W. Gunther Plaut. The Haftarah Commentary, pages 337–46. New York: UAHC Press, 1996. .
Beginning The Journey: Toward a Women's Commentary on Torah. Edited by Emily H. Feigenson, pages 113–50, 155–56. Women of Reform Judaism, The Federation of Temple Sisterhoods, 1997.
Judith Hauptman. “Sotah.” In Rereading the Rabbis: A Woman's Voice, pages 15–29. Boulder, Colorado: Westview Press, 1997. .
Sorel Goldberg Loeb and Barbara Binder Kadden. Teaching Torah: A Treasury of Insights and Activities, pages 235–41. Denver: A.R.E. Publishing, 1997. .
William H.C. Propp. "Insight: Was Samuel a Naz[i]rite?" Bible Review, volume 14 (number 4) (August 1998).
Susan Freeman. Teaching Jewish Virtues: Sacred Sources and Arts Activities, pages 228–40. Springfield, New Jersey: A.R.E. Publishing, 1999. ..
Sarra Levine. "Inscribing jealousy on the Bodies of Women." In The Women's Torah Commentary: New Insights from Women Rabbis on the 54 Weekly Torah Portions. Edited by Elyse Goldstein, pages 261–69. Woodstock, Vermont: Jewish Lights Publishing, 2000. .
Dennis T. Olson. “Numbers.” In The HarperCollins Bible Commentary. Edited by James L. Mays, pages 169–71. New York: HarperCollins Publishers, revised edition, 2000. .
Elie Kaplan Spitz. "Mamzerut." New York: Rabbinical Assembly, 2000. EH 4.2000a. In Responsa: 1991–2000: The Committee on Jewish Law and Standards of the Conservative Movement. Edited by Kassel Abelson and David J. Fine, pages 558, 583–84. New York: Rabbinical Assembly, 2002. . (interpretation of the sotah ritual and its discontinuance).
Lainie Blum Cogan and Judy Weiss. Teaching Haftarah: Background, Insights, and Strategies, pages 39–46. Denver: A.R.E. Publishing, 2002. .
Michael Fishbane. The JPS Bible Commentary: Haftarot, pages 217–22. Philadelphia: Jewish Publication Society, 2002. .
Judith Z. Abrams. "Haftarat Naso: Judges 13:2–25." In The Women's Haftarah Commentary: New Insights from Women Rabbis on the 54 Weekly Haftarah Portions, the 5 Megillot & Special Shabbatot. Edited by Elyse Goldstein, pages 166–70. Woodstock, Vermont: Jewish Lights Publishing, 2004. .
Robert Alter. The Five Books of Moses: A Translation with Commentary, pages 700–20. New York: W.W. Norton & Co., 2004. .
Nili S. Fox. "Numbers." In The Jewish Study Bible. Edited by Adele Berlin and Marc Zvi Brettler, pages 292–301. New York: Oxford University Press, 2004. .
Lisa Grushcow. Writing the Wayward Wife: Rabbinic Interpretations of Sotah. Leiden and Boston: Brill Academic Publishers, 2006. .
Professors on the Parashah: Studies on the Weekly Torah Reading Edited by Leib Moscovitz, pages 238–42. Jerusalem: Urim Publications, 2005. .
W. Gunther Plaut. The Torah: A Modern Commentary: Revised Edition. Revised edition edited by David E.S. Stern, pages 921–49. New York: Union for Reform Judaism, 2006. .
Suzanne A. Brody. "Trial by Waters." In Dancing in the White Spaces: The Yearly Torah Cycle and More Poems, page 94. Shelbyville, Kentucky: Wasteland Press, 2007. .
Jaeyoung Jeon. “Two Laws in the Sotah Passage (Num. V 11–31).” Vetus Testamentum, volume 57 (number 2) (2007): pages 181–207.
Esther Jungreis. Life Is a Test, page 199. Brooklyn: Shaar Press, 2007. .

James L. Kugel. How To Read the Bible: A Guide to Scripture, Then and Now, pages 301, 351, 620. New York: Free Press, 2007. .
Susan Niditch. “The Nazirite Vow: Domesticating Charisma and Recontextualizing Hair” and “Letting Down Her Hair or Cutting It Off: The Ritual Trial of a Woman Accused of Adultery and the Transformation of the Female ‘Other.’” In "My Brother Esau Is a Hairy Man": Hair and Identity in Ancient Israel, pages 81–94, 121–32. New York: Oxford University Press, 2008. .
Ishay Rosen-Zvi. The Mishnaic Sotah Ritual: Temple, Gender, and Midrash. Translated by Orr Scharf. Leiden: Brill, 2012. . Originally published as Yishai Rosen-Zvi,  (The Ritual that Never Was: Temple, Midrash and Gender in Tractate Sota) (Jerusalem: Magnes, 2008).
The Torah: A Women's Commentary. Edited by Tamara Cohn Eskenazi and Andrea L. Weiss, pages 815–42. New York: URJ Press, 2008. .
R. Dennis Cole. "Numbers." In Zondervan Illustrated Bible Backgrounds Commentary. Edited by John H. Walton, volume 1, pages 346–51. Grand Rapids, Michigan: Zondervan, 2009. .
Reuven Hammer. Entering Torah: Prefaces to the Weekly Torah Portion, pages 201–06. New York: Gefen Publishing House, 2009. .
Alicia Jo Rabins. "Secrets/You're Always Watching." In Girls in Trouble. New York: JDub Music, 2009. (song told from the perspective of the wife accused of infidelity).
Toba Spitzer. “From Impurity to Blessing: Parashat Naso (Numbers 4:21–7:89).” In Torah Queeries: Weekly Commentaries on the Hebrew Bible. Edited by Gregg Drinkwater, Joshua Lesser, and David Shneer; foreword by Judith Plaskow, pages 192–96. New York: New York University Press, 2009. .
Terence E. Fretheim. “Numbers.” In The New Oxford Annotated Bible: New Revised Standard Version with the Apocrypha: An Ecumenical Study Bible. Edited by Michael D. Coogan, Marc Z. Brettler, Carol A. Newsom, and Pheme Perkins, pages 194–201. New York: Oxford University Press, Revised 4th Edition 2010. .
Nicholas P. Lunn. “Numbering Israel: A Rhetorico-Structural Analysis of Numbers 1–4.” Journal for the Study of the Old Testament, volume 35 (number 2) (December 2010): pages 167–85.
The Commentators' Bible: Numbers: The JPS Miqra'ot Gedolot. Edited, translated, and annotated by Michael Carasik, pages 26–54. Philadelphia: Jewish Publication Society, 2011. .
Calum Carmichael. The Book of Numbers: A Critique of Genesis, pages 15–67. New Haven: Yale University Press, 2012. .

William G. Dever. The Lives of Ordinary People in Ancient Israel: When Archaeology and the Bible Intersect, page 244. Grand Rapids, Michigan: William B. Eerdmans Publishing Company, 2012. .
Eve Levavi Feinstein. “The ‘Bitter Waters’ of Numbers 5:11–31.” Vetus Testamentum, volume 62 (number 3) (2012): pages 300–06.
Shmuel Herzfeld. "Nazir and Kohein: Two Models of Spirituality." In Fifty-Four Pick Up: Fifteen-Minute Inspirational Torah Lessons, pages 199–203. Jerusalem: Gefen Publishing House, 2012. .

Shlomo Riskin. Torah Lights: Bemidbar: Trials and Tribulations in Times of Transition, pages 31–58. New Milford, Connecticut: Maggid Books, 2012. .
Shivi Greenfield. “The Theater of Deviance and the Normative Boundaries of Society: Lessons from the Rabbinic Interpretations to the Biblical Law of Sotah.” Journal of Law and Religion, volume 28 (number 1) (2012–2013): pages 105–42.
Janson C. Condren. “Is the Account of the Organization of the Camp Devoid of Organization? A Proposal for the Literary Structure of Numbers 1.1–10.10.” Journal for the Study of the Old Testament, volume 37 (number 4) (June 2013): pages 423–52.
Aaron Koller. Review of The Mishnaic Sotah Ritual: Temple, Gender, and Midrash, by Ishay Rosen-Zvi. Review of Biblical Literature (October 2013).
Eve Levavi Feinstein. “The Suspected Adulteress (Num 5:11–31).” In Sexual Pollution in the Hebrew Bible, pages 43–50. New York: Oxford University Press, 2014. .

Jonathan Sacks. Lessons in Leadership: A Weekly Reading of the Jewish Bible, pages 189–92. New Milford, Connecticut: Maggid Books, 2015. .
Avivah Gottlieb Zornberg. Bewilderments: Reflections on the Book of Numbers, pages 31–62. New York: Schocken Books, 2015. .
David Booth, Ashira Konigsburg, and Baruch Frydman-Kohl. “Modesty Inside and Out: A Contemporary Guide to Tzniut,” page 8. New York: Rabbinical Assembly, 2016. ( and covering a woman’s hair).
Jonathan Sacks. Essays on Ethics: A Weekly Reading of the Jewish Bible, pages 221–25. New Milford, Connecticut: Maggid Books, 2016. .
Nissim Amzallag and Shamir Yona. “The Kenite Origin of the Sotah Prescription (Numbers 5.11–31).” Journal for the Study of the Old Testament, volume 41 (number 4) (June 2017): pages 383–412.
Shai Held. The Heart of Torah, Volume 2: Essays on the Weekly Torah Portion: Leviticus, Numbers, and Deuteronomy, pages 103–13. Philadelphia: Jewish Publication Society, 2017. .
Steven Levy and Sarah Levy. The JPS Rashi Discussion Torah Commentary, pages 116–19. Philadelphia: Jewish Publication Society, 2017. .
Jonathan Sacks. Numbers: The Wilderness Years: Covenant & Conversation: A Weekly Reading of the Jewish Bible, pages 71–106. New Milford, Connecticut: Maggid Books, 2017. .

External links

Texts
Masoretic text and 1917 JPS translation
Hear the parashah chanted
Hear the parashah read in Hebrew

Commentaries

Academy for Jewish Religion, California
Academy for Jewish Religion, New York
Aish.com 
Akhlah: The Jewish Children's Learning Network
Aleph Beta Academy
American Jewish University — Ziegler School of Rabbinic Studies
Anshe Emes Synagogue, Los Angeles 
Ari Goldwag
Ascent of Safed
Bar-Ilan University 
Chabad.org
The Desert Tabernacle
eparsha.com
G-dcast
The Israel Koschitzky Virtual Beit Midrash
Jewish Agency for Israel
Jewish Theological Seminary
Kabbala Online
Mechon Hadar
Miriam Aflalo
MyJewishLearning.com
Ohr Sameach
Orthodox Union
OzTorah, Torah from Australia
Oz Ve Shalom — Netivot Shalom
Pardes from Jerusalem
Professor James L. Kugel
Professor Michael Carasik
Rabbi Dov Linzer
Rabbi Eliezer Melamed 
Rabbi Fabian Werbin
Rabbi Jonathan Sacks
RabbiShimon.com 
Rabbi Shlomo Riskin
Rabbi Shmuel Herzfeld
Rabbi Stan Levin 
Reconstructionist Judaism 
Sephardic Institute
Shiur.com
613.org Jewish Torah Audio
Teach613.org, Torah Education at Cherry Hill
TheTorah.com
Torah from Dixie 
Torah.org
TorahVort.com
Union for Reform Judaism
United Synagogue of Conservative Judaism
What's Bothering Rashi?
Yeshiva University
Yeshivat Chovevei Torah

Weekly Torah readings in Sivan
Weekly Torah readings from Numbers
Samson